Ricardo Alberto Frione (first name also spelled Riccardo; February 7, 1911 in Montevideo – March 11, 1986) was an Uruguay professional football player. He also held Italian citizenship due to his Italian descent.

His younger brother Francisco Frione also played football professionally. To distinguish them, Ricardo Alberto was referred to as Frione I and Francisco as Frione II.

References

1911 births
1986 deaths
Uruguayan footballers
Montevideo Wanderers F.C. players
Serie A players
Serie B players
Inter Milan players
Cosenza Calcio 1914 players
U.S. Salernitana 1919 players
Uruguayan expatriate footballers
Expatriate footballers in Switzerland
Servette FC players
Parma Calcio 1913 players
S.S.D. Sanremese Calcio players
People of Ligurian descent
Uruguayan people of Italian descent
Association football forwards
A.S.D. La Biellese players